is one of five maritime colleges in Japan. Established in 1881, it is the oldest continuously-operated national maritime college in the country.

Toba maritime programs
The programs are of about 4.5 years and an additional 1.5 years of practical training in the sea. The college conducts the following maritime programs:
Nautical program for Deck Officers and Captains
Marine Engineering programs for Engineering Officers
Advanced Programs (Maritime System Major and the Information Control / Mechatronics Production System Engineering Major)

See also
List of maritime colleges

References

External links
Toba college website

Educational institutions established in 1881
Maritime colleges in Japan
1881 establishments in Japan
Universities and colleges in Mie Prefecture